Carmen John Queen (10 August 1912 – 23 February 1974) was Anglican Bishop of Huron in Canada in the third quarter of the  20th century.

Educated at the University of Western Ontario, Queen was ordained in 1925. After curacies at London, Ontario and Burford he became Rector of Princeton in 1938. After further incumbencies at Ridgetown, Tillsonburg and Ingersoll he became Domestic Chaplain to the Bishop of Huron. Further promotions (to be the Archdeacon then Suffragan Bishop  of Huron) followed before he became its Diocesan in 1970. He died in post on 23 February 1974.

Notes

 

 

1912 births
University of Western Ontario alumni
Anglican bishops of Huron
20th-century Anglican Church of Canada bishops
1974 deaths